Temperance Flowerdew, Lady Yeardley (1590 – 1628) was an early settler of the Jamestown Colony and a key member of the Flowerdew family, significant participants in the history of Jamestown.  Temperance Flowerdew was wife of two Governors of Virginia, sister of another early colonist, aunt to a representative at the first General Assembly and "cousin-german" (first cousin) to the Secretary to the Colony.

Flowerdew was one of the few survivors of the winter of 1609–10, known as the "Starving Time", which killed almost ninety percent of Jamestown's inhabitants.  Later, upon the death of her second husband, George Yeardley, Flowerdew became one of the wealthiest women in Virginia.  Upon her death, the estate was transferred to her children despite the efforts of her third husband to claim it.  
Flowerdew was named one of the Virginia Women in History by the Library of Virginia in 2018.

Sea voyage

Mrs. Temperance Barrow sailed for Jamestown aboard the Falcon, commanded by Captain John Martin, in May 1609 in a convoy of nine ships as part of the Virginia Company of London's Third Supply Mission. Whether she was accompanied by her husband, Richard Barrow, is not of record.  The flagship of the convoy, the Sea Venture, had the new leaders for Jamestown aboard, including George Yeardley.  During the trip, the convoy encountered a severe storm which was quite likely a hurricane.  The Sea Venture became separated from the rest of the convoy, ultimately coming aground on the island of Bermuda, where it was stranded for months. The Falcon continued on, reaching Jamestown in August 1609.

Arrival in Jamestown

Temperance Barrow arrived in Jamestown just before the winter of the Starving Time, an extraordinarily harsh winter which the majority of townspeople did not survive. As provisions grew scarce, some thirty colonists tried to steal corn from Powhatan, but most of the men were slain during the attempt, only two escaping.  The "common stores that should have kept all of the colonists through the winter" were instead "severely reduced by Indian raids and consumed by the commanders".  The colonists subsisted on roots, herbs, acorns, berries, and fish. By the end of the winter, the five hundred English who had been left in Virginia only numbered about sixty.

In May 1610, the survivors of the Sea Venture finally arrived, in two smaller ships constructed from its wreckage.  The newcomers were "shocked to discover the state of the colony".  Sir Thomas Gates took control as the new Lieutenant-Governor and decided to abandon the town.  They loaded the survivors on the ships and headed down river.  The next morning, they encountered a long-boat with dispatches from Lord De La Warr.  He had just arrived with three ships, loaded with supplies for Jamestown.  They all returned up the river, back to Jamestown, on the same day, and Lord De La Warr arrived two days later.

The Falcon 
According to the 1624/5 Jamestown Muster, Temperance Flowerdew came over on the Falcon. She was the only one still living in the colony of Virginia in the muster who came over on the Falcon in 1609.

Family and marriages
Temperance Flowerdew was the daughter of Anthony Flowerdew, of Hethersett, Norfolk, and his wife Martha Stanley (d.1626) of Scottow, Norfolk. Through her paternal grandmother she was the grand-niece of Amy Robsart. Her paternal grandparents were William Flowerdew and Frances Appleyard. Frances Appleyard was the elder half-sister of Amy Robsart, first wife of Robert Dudley. Frances was the daughter of Roger Appleyard of Stanfield (d.1528) and Elizabeth Scott (d.1549), who married secondly Sir John Robsart of Syderstone (d.1557). Roger Appleyard's father was Sir Nicholas Appleyard of Bracon Ash. Temperance's other paternal great-grandfather was John Flowerdew of Hethersett, Sergeant at Law, who was the father of her grandfather William Flowerdew and of Edward Flowerdew, Baron of the Exchequer, her great-uncle.

First marriage
She married Richard Barrow on April 29, 1609 at St Gregory by St Paul's, London, by special licence a month before the Falcon left Plymouth on 2 June 1609, after a number of delays, as part of the fleet headed for Jamestown and the New World. 

Barrow was a prominent family in Temperance’s native Norfolk.

The next we hear of Temperance is in a 1623/4 list of the colony of Virginia's inhabitants who survived the 1622 Indian attack.

Second marriage
On A List of Names of the Living in Virginia, February the 16th, 1623/4, we find Temperance, Lady Yeardley, her husband Sir George Yeardley, and their three children, Elizabeth, Argall and Francis Yeardley.

The accepted date of marriage by genealogists is that on 18 October 1618 she married George Yeardley. Exactly a month later he was appointed to serve three years as governor of Virginia, and was knighted by James VI and I during an audience at Newmarket on 24 November". 

The source of the date seems unclear. The year 1618 for their marriage seems to crop up as early as 1912. It may simply be based on daughter Elizabeth's year of birth. The year 1618 seems to be conjecture by James P. C. Southall in his 1947 article Concerning George Yardley and Temperance Flowerdew: A Synopsis and Review. According to the same source, Yeardley «went to England in the latter half of the year 1617 and was absent from Virginia during whole of the following year 1618.»   

In the 24 January 1624/5 census of the inhabitants of Virginia, known as the Muster, the couple's oldest child Elizabeth is six years old, and "borne heare". This would mean that Elizabeth was born after 24 January 1618 and before 25 January 1619.  

The couple had three children:
Elizabeth Yeardley (1618/9–1660).
Argall Yeardley (1620/1–1655).
Francis Yeardley (1623/4–1655), "Upon reaching manhood he became quite prominent in the affairs of Virginia, being for some time a colonel of militia and in 1653 a member of the House of Burgesses for Lower Norfolk."

Third marriage

Sir George Yeardley died on November 13, 1627.  On March 31, 1628, Flowerdew married his successor, Governor Francis West.

Temperance Flowerdew died in December of the same year, leaving her three children, aged 5, 8, and 10, as orphans, the estate she had inherited from Yeardley was divided among their three children. George Yeardley's brother, Ralph Yeardley, became trustee for the property. Governor West went to London to contest the will, but failed in the effort.

Other family
Stanley Flowerdew (d.1620) was her brother and also lived in Jamestown during the same era and involved with the Flowerdew Hundred Plantation. One of the representatives from the  Flowerdew Hundred sent to the first General Assembly in Jamestown in 1619, was named, Ensign Edmund Rossingham. This was a son of Temperance Flowerdew's elder sister Mary Flowerdew and her husband Dionysis Rossingham. John Pory, the Secretary to the Colony, was the first cousin of Temperance Flowerdew.

Her mother's death 
Her mother Martha died on 4 February 1625/26 and was buried 5 February at Scottow. In her will, dated 3 February 1625/6 and proven 4 December 1626, she leaves ‘my daughter Temperance Yeardley alias Flowerdew my seal ring of gold’.

Witness to John Rolfe's will

In 1622, Temperance Yeardley witnessed the will of John Rolfe, a fellow native of Norfolk.  The other witnesses were Richard Buck (also from Norfolk) John Cartwright, Robert Davie, and John Milwards.

Flowerdew Hundred

In 1619, her husband George Yeardley patented  of land on Mulberry Island. He owned another private plantation upriver on the south side of the James River opposite Tanks Weyanoke, named Flowerdew Hundred. However, the land appears to have been in use by Stanley Flowerdew, Yeardley's brother-in-law, before it was patented by Yeardley. Although George Yeardley acquired the thousand acres that he named Flowerdew Hundred in 1619, it seems very likely that some settlement had begun there before that date, for his brother-in-law Stanley Flowerdew took a shipment of tobacco to England in the same year, probably grown on the same property. With a population of about thirty, Flowerdew Hundred Plantation was economically successful with thousands of pounds of tobacco produced along with corn, fish and livestock. In 1621 Yeardley paid 120 pounds (possibly a hogshead of tobacco) to build the first windmill in British America. The windmill was an English post design and was transferred by deed in the property's 1624 sale to Abraham Piersey, a Cape Merchant of the London Company. The plantation survived the 1622 onslaught of Powhatan Indians, losing only six people. so the plantation may have been associated with the Flowerdew name before Yeardley's patent. Note that Yeardley named his Mulberry Island plantation "Stanley Hundred".  
  
In 1624, Yeardley sold Flowerdew Hundred to Abraham Piersey, and the deed from that sale is said to be the oldest in America.

Notes

References
Athearn, Robert G.  The New World: American Heritage New Illustrated History of the United States, Volume 1. Dell Publishing Co., Inc., New York, 1963.
Collins, Gail.  America's Women: 400 Years of Dolls, Drudges, Helpmates, and Heroines. Harper Collins Publishers, New York, 2003.
"Francis Yeardley's Narrative of Excursions into Carolina, 1654," in Narratives of early Carolina, 1650-1708, ed. A.S. Salley, (New York, C. Scribner's Sons, 1911), 21-29

External links
 The History Channel Interactive Jamestown Exhibit
 Biography of Temperance Flowerdew
 Starving Winter of 1609–1610 – Temperance Flowerdew
 Lady Yeardley in Historical Jamestown

1628 deaths
Colonial American women
Virginia colonial people
People from Hethersett
People from Jamestown, Virginia
English emigrants
Year of birth uncertain
1590 births
Burials at Jamestown Church
West family